Osteopathia striata is a rare entity characterized by fine linear striations about 2- to 3-mm-thick, visible by radiographic examination, in the metaphyses and diaphyses of long or flat bones. It is often asymptomatic, and is often discovered incidentally.

See also 
 List of radiographic findings associated with cutaneous conditions

References 

Radiologic signs